Rue Mondétour is a small pedestrian street in the 1st arrondissement of the city of Paris.

Origin 
This street is perhaps its name to the lords of Mondetour, and particularly Claude Foucault, Lord of Mondetour who was alderman of the city of Paris in 1525 under the provost master Jean Morin. Other historians assumed that the name of this track is a street Maudestour alteration or Bad Detour.

Bibliography 
 Henri Sauval  : History and research of the antiquities of the city of Paris
 Jean La Tynna, Dictionary topographic, etymological and historical of the streets of Paris (1817)
 Jacques Hillairet , Historical Dictionary of the streets of Paris
 Guillot de Paris , Le Dit des rues de Paris with preface, notes and glossary by Edgar Mareuse

References 

Streets in the 1st arrondissement of Paris